Post-amendment to the Tamil Nadu Entertainments Tax Act 1939 on 1 April 1958, Gross jumped to 140 per cent of Nett Commercial Taxes Department disclosed 14.99 crore in entertainment tax revenue for the year.

The following is a list of films produced in the Tamil film industry in India in 1977, in alphabetical order.

1977

References

Films, Tamil
Lists of 1977 films by country or language
1977
1970s Tamil-language films